Magadi Bird Sanctuary created at the Magadi tank, it is one of the biodiversity hotspots of Karnataka.

 
The Magadi tank is located in Magadi village of Shirhatti Taluk, Gadag District. From Gadag it is 26 km, it is located on Gadag-Bangalore Road, from Shirhatti it is 8 km,  and from Lakshmeshwar 11 km. The sanctuary covers 134 acres of land and has catchment area of about 900 hectares.

The bar-headed goose is one of the birds which migrate to Magadi wetlands. The following bird species were also observed: Grey Heron, Purple Heron, Comb Duck, Oriental Ibis, White Breasted Water Hen, Greater Flamingo, Black winged stilt, cattle egret, Asian Open Bill Stork, Woolly necked stork, Painted stork, Eurasian Spoonbill, Ruddy Sheld Duck or Brahmini Duck. Normally birds eat fish, amphibians, molluscs, snakes etc., but migratory birds eating agricultural produce is both interesting and curious too. In the winter it feeds on barley, rice and wheat and it may damage crops.

Controlling authorities
Controlling authorities of the Magadi tank are Department of Fisheries, Government of Karnataka and Village Panchayat, Magadi.

Local institutions
Local institutions include the village panchayat, development of tank fisheries and bird sanctuary
 
Karnatak University supports the study of birds.

See also
 Gadag
 Lakkundi
 Dambal
 Lakshmeshwar
 Mahadeva Temple (Itagi)
 Gadag-Betageri

References

External links

Bird sanctuaries of Karnataka
Gadag district
Protected areas with year of establishment missing